Thomas Patrick Burke (28 August 1910 – 17 January 1973) was a member of the Parliament of Australia.

Burke was born at Berkshire Valley, near Moora, Western Australia. His birth name was Frederick Thomas, but he was informally renamed Patrick Thomas by his father, Peter Francis Burke, and he was always called Tom. He later formally changed his name to Thomas Patrick in 1963. He was educated by correspondence and at Miling State School and later worked as a cartage contractor while studying accountancy. In 1941, he married Madeline Muirson Orr. He enlisted in the Royal Australian Air Force in January 1943 and served with the ground staff at Kalgoorlie.

Political career
Burke was elected at the 1943 election to the House of Representatives seat of Perth, representing the Labor Party. Although he had high aspirations he was not selected for the ministry during the Curtin and Chifley governments. A member of the party's right wing, he was a strong opponent of H. V. Evatt; and in 1955, at the time of the split in the ALP, was banned from representing the Western Australian branch at federal conferences of the party. Nevertheless, unlike various other Labor right-wingers, he did not join the Australian Labor Party (Anti-Communist) (later the DLP). At the 1955 election he was defeated by Fred Chaney.

In 1957, Burke was expelled from the party, but seven years later he regained his membership. He failed to gain Labor pre-selection for Perth in 1965 and 1968. Instead, he promoted his sons' careers. Terry Burke became member for Perth from 1968 to 1987. Brian Burke became member for Balcatta in 1973 (later redistributed and renamed Balga) in the Western Australian Parliament and later served as state premier from February 1983 until February 1988.

Burke lived long enough to see Labor return to government under Gough Whitlam in 1972. He died of myocardial infarction in Perth on 17 January 1973, survived by his wife, three sons and two daughters.

References

1910 births
1973 deaths
Australian Labor Party members of the Parliament of Australia
Labor Right politicians
Members of the Australian House of Representatives for Perth
Members of the Australian House of Representatives
Australian people of Irish descent
People from Moora, Western Australia
20th-century Australian politicians
Royal Australian Air Force personnel of World War II